Liu Hulan (刘胡兰) is a 1954 Chinese-language western-style opera by Chen Zi. It is based on the death of a 14-year-old communist party girl Liu Hulan, who was elevated into a revolutionary martyr. Part of the original opera was composed in 1949, only 2 years after her death, and revised into a full-scale opera in 1954. Several other composers such as Ge Guangrui also contributed to Chen's opera. A similar opera based on another revolutionary martyr is Sister Jiang.

References

Chinese western-style operas
Operas
1954 operas
Operas set in China
Cultural depictions of Chinese women
Cultural depictions of activists
Operas set in the 20th century
Operas based on real people
Operas by multiple composers
Shanxi in fiction